"Es ist Liebe" (English: It Is Love) is a song by German recording artist Nadja Benaissa. It was written by Benaissa and Tino Oac for her debut solo album Schritt für Schritt (2006), while production was helmed by Oac. Released as the album's lead single, it debuted and peaked at number 64 on the German Singles Chart.

Track listings

Credits and personnel

 Suanne Bader – brass
 Nadja Benaissa – lead vocals, lyrics, music
 Ulf Hattwig – mastering
 Alex Nies – drums

 Tini Oac – mixing, production, recording
 Woolf Schönecker – guitar
 Florian Sitzmann – mixing, organ

Charts

References

2006 songs